Scott Dean Boras (born November 2, 1952) is an American sports agent, specializing in baseball. He is the founder, owner and president of the Boras Corporation, a sports agency based in Newport Beach, California, that represents roughly 175 professional baseball clients. Since 2013, Forbes magazine has named Boras the "Most Powerful Sports Agent in the World." In 2019 and 2022, contracts signed by his clients totaled more than $1 billion in the month of December.

Early life and playing career
Boras was born in Sacramento and grew up in Elk Grove, California, the son of a dairy farmer. He attended the University of the Pacific and made the baseball team as a walk on. He led the team with a .312 batting average in 1972. As of 2009, Boras was in the top 10 in school history in multiple offensive categories. Boras was inducted into the Pacific Athletics Hall of Fame in 1995, and the baseball team's annual "Most Improved Player" award is named in his honor. Following his college career, Boras played four years of minor league baseball for the St. Louis Cardinals and Chicago Cubs organizations. Boras made the Florida State League All-Star team in 1976, but knee problems shortened his career and he retired with a career batting average of .288. Boras received his Doctor of Pharmacy degree from the University of the Pacific in 1977.
 

Following his playing career, Boras returned to the University of the Pacific, earning his Juris Doctor degree from the university's McGeorge School of Law in 1982. After law school, Boras worked as an associate in the pharmaceutical defense department of the Chicago firm Rooks, Pitts & Poust (now Dykema Gossett), defending drug companies against class-action lawsuits.

Boras Corporation
Boras's start as an agent came representing Manny Trillo, a former major league shortstop for the Philadelphia Phillies and other teams, and Bill Caudill, a former minor league teammate and closer for the Seattle Mariners, both of whom now work for Boras. By 1980, he had decided his calling was as a baseball agent. In 1983, Boras negotiated one of the largest contracts in baseball history, $7.5 million for Caudill; and not long afterward Boras left his law firm job to represent players full-time.

Today, Boras is the president and owner of the Boras Corporation, a baseball-only sports agency. In 2014, the Boras Corporation was named by Forbes magazine as the most valuable single-sport agency in the world.

Boras and his company Boras Corporation have become known for record-setting contracts for their free agent and amateur draft clients. Boras was the first baseball agent to negotiate contracts in excess of $50 million: Greg Maddux, five years, $57.5 million in 1997; $100 million Kevin Brown, seven years, $105 million in 1998; and $200 million Alex Rodriguez, 10 years, $252 million in 2000.

Boras has represented many of the elite players in each year's amateur draft and been a strong advocate for increasing player compensation. Boras' first record-setting contract for a drafted player was $150,000 for Tim Belcher in 1983. Since then, Boras clients regularly pushed draft compensation higher, starting with $247,500 for Andy Benes in 1988; a $1.01 million guarantee for Ben McDonald in 1989, including a $350,000 bonus; a $1.2 million guarantee, including a $500,000 bonus for Todd Van Poppel in 1990; $1.55 million for Brien Taylor in 1991; continuing through $8.5 million for J. D. Drew in 1998 and $9.5 million for Mark Teixeira in 2001. In 2009, Boras clients broke several draft records, led by Stephen Strasburg, who surpassed the $15 million barrier with the largest contract in draft history at that time with $15.1 million; Donavan Tate, who received the largest signing bonus ever given to a high school player at $6.25 million; and Jacob Turner, who received the largest signing bonus ever given to a high school pitcher at $4.7 million.

The Boras Corporation operates out of a $20 million, two-story, glass-and-steel building in Newport Beach, California. Subsidiary companies include Boras Marketing, which does memorabilia, marketing, and endorsements; and the Boras Sports Training Institute for strength/conditioning and sports psychology. Many of the 75-person staff are former major leaguers, including Bob Brower, Don Carman, Bill Caudill, Scott Chiamparino, Mike Fischlin, Calvin Murray, Jeff Musselman, Domingo Ramos and Kurt Stillwell. The company has scouts across the United States, Asia and Latin America. Staff also includes an MIT-trained economist, former NASA computer engineer, three lawyers, five personal trainers, an investment team, although the firm does not provide investment services for clients. Also on staff is a sports psychologist and a 14-person research staff charged with watching each day's games and reporting to Boras.

Notable active clients
Here is a list of Boras Corp. notable active clients:

José Altuve, 2B, HOU
Francisco Álvarez, C, NYM
Elvis Andrus, SS, Free Agent (FA)
Randy Arozarena, OF, TB
Josh Bell, 1B, CLE
Cody Bellinger, CF/1B, CHC
Xander Bogaerts, SS, SD
Alec Bohm, 3B, PHI
Jackie Bradley Jr., CF, FA
Alex Bregman, 3B, HOU
Zack Britton, RP, FA
Kris Bryant, 3B/OF, COL
Nick Castellanos, RF/DH, PHI
Dylan Cease, SP, CWS
Matt Chapman, 3B, TOR
Gerrit Cole, SP, NYY
Michael Conforto, RF, SF
Carlos Correa, SS, MIN 
Joey Gallo, OF, MIN
MacKenzie Gore, SP, WSH
Bryce Harper, RF, PHI
Gunnar Henderson, SS/3B, BAL
Rhys Hoskins, 1B, PHI
Eric Hosmer, 1B, FA
José Iglesias, SS, FA
Jonathan India, 2B, CIN
Ian Kennedy, RP, FA
Dallas Keuchel, SP, FA
Yusei Kikuchi, SP, TOR
Shea Langeliers, C, OAK
Royce Lewis, SS, MIN
Sean Manaea, SP, SF
J. D. Martinez, DH, LAD
Lance McCullers Jr., SP, HOU
MJ Melendez, C/OF, KC
Frankie Montas, SP, NYY
Mike Moustakas, 3B, CIN
Brandon Nimmo, CF, NYM
Tyler O'Neill, LF, STL
James Paxton, SP, BOS
Jurickson Profar, OF, FA
Anthony Rendon, 3B, LAA
Carlos Rodón, SP, NYY
Hyun-jin Ryu, SP, TOR
Max Scherzer, SP, NYM
Corey Seager, SS, TEX
Marcus Semien, 2B, TEX
Blake Snell, SP, SD
Juan Soto, RF, SD
Bryson Stott, SS, PHI
Stephen Strasburg, SP, WSH
Spencer Torkelson, 1B, DET
Julio Urías, SP, LAD
Miguel Vargas, IF, LAD
Taijuan Walker SP, PHI
Masataka Yoshida, OF, BOS

Negotiations
Over the course of his career, Boras has represented hundreds of players on all 30 major league teams and has participated in dozens of high-profile negotiations. Boras' specialty is the record-breaking contract, which he says is the most difficult to achieve because it then provides an "umbrella" from which other players can benefit. Boras is well known for identifying sources of leverage for his clients and using them for the clients' advantage. This has included advising draft picks to return to school instead of signing, taking advantage of the right to go to salary arbitration hearings, and advising superstars to wait for free agency instead of taking "hometown discount" contracts. This does not endear him to fans, who regularly side with their favorite teams and not individual players. Boras, however, has said his job is to represent his clients' interests, even if it means weathering public criticism. Boras' innovative strategies have benefited his clients enough that Major League Baseball has changed its rules in response to his actions on multiple occasions. This has led to descriptions of Boras ranging from "baseball's most hated man" and "baseball's answer to Lord Voldemort" to the man "players can't afford to live without."

1980s
 Boras' first major contract showdown was between Bill Caudill and the Toronto Blue Jays in February 1985. Caudill was eligible for salary arbitration, and Boras negotiated a $1.5 million contract that made Caudill the second-highest paid reliever in the game.
 In 1988, Boras represented the top three picks in the amateur draft: Andy Benes, Mark Lewis and Steve Avery. Benes signed for a $235,000 bonus, the largest in baseball history at the time.
 The next year, in 1989, Boras negotiated the first multi-year major league contract ever given to a baseball-only amateur, a $1.01 million deal for first overall pick Ben McDonald with the Baltimore Orioles, which included a $350,000 signing bonus.

1990s
 In 1990, Boras stunned baseball officials by securing a record $1.2 million guaranteed major league contract for the #14 pick in the draft, high school pitcher Todd Van Poppel. The contract included a $500,000 signing bonus.
 In 1991, Boras again set a record by securing a $1.55 million bonus from the New York Yankees for high school phenomenon Brien Taylor.
 In 1992, Boras negotiated a record five-year, $28 million contract for Greg Maddux with the Atlanta Braves, eclipsing the second-best offer by $9 million. The contract trailed only David Cone's contract in terms of annual value and was two years longer.
 In 1993, Boras represented the first two picks in the draft, Alex Rodriguez and Darren Dreifort. Both eventually received $1.3 million contracts, although Rodriguez signed against Boras' advice. Boras was demanding a $3 million deal, and nearly prevented Rodriguez from signing at all.
 In 1996, Boras used an obscure provision in the major league rules to have draft picks Matt White (seventh overall pick, San Francisco Giants) and Bobby Seay (12th overall pick, Chicago White Sox) declared free agents. White and Seay both then signed with the expansion Tampa Bay Devil Rays, with White receiving a $10.2 million contract and Seay receiving a $3 million bonus, significantly more than what they would have received via the draft process. The following year, Major League Baseball changed its rules in response to Boras' success in circumventing the draft, which had resulted in at least $25 million in extra money for his clients. For many years, being "outsmarted" by Boras and losing Seay remained a sore spot for White Sox owner Jerry Reinsdorf, one of Commissioner Bud Selig's closest allies.
 In 1997, Boras advised draft pick J. D. Drew not to accept the Philadelphia Phillies' $3 million offer. Drew instead signed a professional contract with the independent St. Paul Saints. Boras and the MLBPA then filed a grievance to have Drew declared a free agent since only "amateurs" could be subject to what was then known as the "amateur draft". Boras won the argument, but the arbitrator ruled he could not grant Drew free agency since he was not a member of the MLBPA. Instead, Drew re-entered the draft the following year and signed with the St. Louis Cardinals for nearly three times the Phillies' best offer. Major League Baseball again was forced to amend its rules because of Boras; the draft is now called the "First Year Player Draft" as a result of the Drew grievance.
 Following the 1997 season, Boras broke the $50 million barrier by negotiating a five-year, $57.5 million contract for Greg Maddux with the Atlanta Braves, making Maddux the highest paid player in the game.
 Only a year later, in 1998, Boras broke the $100 million barrier by negotiating a seven-year, $105 million contract for Kevin Brown with the Los Angeles Dodgers. Brown dethroned Maddux as the highest-paid player in the game.
 Also in 1998, Boras negotiated a seven-year, $87.5 million contract for Bernie Williams to stay with the New York Yankees, even though the Yankees had made a public statement that they would not exceed $60 million for Williams.
 In 1999, Boras filed a grievance on behalf of Adrián Beltré because the Los Angeles Dodgers falsified Beltré's Dominican Republic birth records prior to signing him in 1994. Team representatives changed the records in order to sign Beltré when he was only 15 (under baseball rules international prospects are not eligible to sign until they are 16). In response to Boras's grievance, Commissioner Bud Selig awarded Beltré damages of $48,500. Additionally, Selig imposed significant penalties on the Dodgers.
 Other Boras clients in the 1990s included Keith Hernandez, Alex Fernandez, Charles Johnson, Robb Nen, Jay Bell and Jim Abbott.

2000
 In 2000, under Boras's supervision, high school prospect Landon Powell earned his GED following his junior year of high school and then filed the necessary paperwork to make him eligible for that year's draft. Powell went undrafted, since the major league teams did not expect him to be draft eligible, making him a free agent. Whether because of Powell's ability, his pricetag, or internal resentment within Major League Baseball about his successful end-run around the draft, Powell did not sign, instead enrolling at the University of South Carolina.
 At the baseball Winter Meetings following the 2000 season, Boras negotiated two record-breaking contracts for clients who had gone first and second overall in the 1993 draft. The former second pick, Darren Dreifort, was the first to sign, with Boras finalizing a five-year, $55 million contract for Dreifort to stay with the Los Angeles Dodgers on December 11.
 One day later, on December 12, Boras finalized what was then the largest contract in professional sports history, a 10-year, $252 million contract for former first overall pick Alex Rodriguez to play for the Texas Rangers. The contract doubled the previous record for an American team sport, Kevin Garnett's $126 million contract with the Minnesota Timberwolves, and exceeded the price owner Tom Hicks had paid for the entire Rangers franchise three years earlier.

2001
 In February 2001, Boras and Andruw Jones defeated the Atlanta Braves in salary arbitration, with Jones earning an arbitration-record $8.2 million salary in only his second year of arbitration eligibility. The Jones decision remained the largest salary arbitration win for any player in history until 2008.
 The Texas Rangers and Boras engaged in another high-profile negotiation after the June 2001 draft. Boras negotiated a $9.5 million, four-year major league contract for fifth overall pick Mark Teixeira.
 In December 2001, Boras and free agent Barry Bonds, the reigning National League MVP, surprised the San Francisco Giants by accepting the club's offer of salary arbitration. Boras eventually negotiated a five-year, $90 million contract for the 37-year-old slugger.

2002
 In December 2002, for the second year in a row, a Boras free agent client surprised his former team by accepting salary arbitration. This time, it was Greg Maddux accepting the offer from the Atlanta Braves. Boras eventually negotiated a record-breaking $14.75 million contract for the star pitcher, at the time the largest one-year contract in baseball history.

2003
 In December 2003, Boras was a part of the complex multi-party negotiations that would have resulted in Alex Rodriguez being traded from the Texas Rangers to the Boston Red Sox. Boras and Rodriguez offered to accept $12 million in reduced salaries in return for marketing rights and the right for Rodriguez to be a free agent after the 2005 season. The trade was eventually killed by the MLBPA because it would have cost Rodriguez $30 million in previously guaranteed compensation, setting a bad precedent (from the union's perspective) regarding the renegotiation of guaranteed contracts.

2004
 In February 2004, Boras again negotiated regarding a trade for Alex Rodriguez, this time successfully from the Texas Rangers to the New York Yankees. Once again, because of the complexity of Rodriguez's contract, several contractual modifications were necessary for the trade to happen, but unlike the prior year, none of the changes sacrificed previously guaranteed compensation.
 Boras represented the two consensus top prospects in the 2004 draft, Stephen Drew and Jered Weaver. The San Diego Padres had the first pick in the draft and were prepared to select Drew or Weaver, but Padres owner John Moores ordered the team to select Matt Bush in order to save money. Drew eventually received a $5.5 million major league contract from the Arizona Diamondbacks and was their starting shortstop from his major league debut in 2006 until his trade to the Oakland Athletics in 2012. Weaver eventually received a $4 million bonus from the Los Angeles Angels of Anaheim and won 16 games in 2009. Bush has hit .219 for his career, was converted to a pitcher, endured a series of off-field legal problems, and was cut by Toronto in 2009 for their zero-tolerance behavior policy. On January 28, 2010, Bush signed a minor league contract with the Tampa Bay Rays with an invite to spring training. Bush didn't make his debut until he was 30 years old in 2016 for the Texas Rangers.
 Following the 2004 season, Boras negotiated a five-year, $55 million contract for J. D. Drew to play for the Los Angeles Dodgers. Boras included the right to opt out of the contract after two years, which Drew used effectively after the 2006 season.
 In mid-December 2004, Boras brokered a five-year, $64 million contract for Adrián Beltré with the Seattle Mariners.
 Later that month, Boras negotiated a four-year, $40 million contract for Boston Red Sox catcher and team captain Jason Varitek to return to the team.

2005
 In January 2005, Boras negotiated his third contract in excess of $100 million, this time sending Carlos Beltrán to the New York Mets for $119 million guaranteed over seven years.
 A few days later, Boras negotiates a four-year $36 million contract for Derek Lowe with the Los Angeles Dodgers.
 The next month, Boras negotiated another contract with a potential value in excess of $100 million, when Magglio Ordóñez agreed to a five-year, $75 million contract with two vesting option years that push the potential value to $105 million over seven years. The contract was complicated by language allowing the Tigers to void the contract after the 2005 season if Ordóñez's previous knee problems returned.
 Also in February 2005, Boras won a salary arbitration case for Kyle Lohse against the Minnesota Twins. Lohse received a raise from $395,000 to $2.4 million.
 In December 2005, Boras negotiated a four-year, $52 million contract for Boston Red Sox center fielder Johnny Damon to join the rival New York Yankees. The Red Sox had failed to improve their $40 million offer, thinking Boras was bluffing.
 Also in December 2005, Boras landed a five-year, $60 million contract for Kevin Millwood with the Texas Rangers, despite Millwood's history of arm trouble. The deal gave the Rangers the ability to void the final year of the contract (2010) if Millwood did not meet certain innings totals. However, Millwood met the required threshold in September 2009.

2006
 In February 2006, Boras won a salary arbitration hearing for Kyle Lohse for the second year in a row, defeating the Minnesota Twins and earning Lohse a raise to $3.95 million. Lohse became the first player to win back-to-back arbitration cases since 1991.
 In June 2006, Boras client and former University of Tennessee star pitcher Luke Hochevar was selected first overall in the draft by the Kansas City Royals. Hochevar eventually signed a four-year major league contract for $5.2 million guaranteed, with the opportunity to make up to $7 million. The contract vindicated Boras's advice; at the prompting of a different agent, Hochevar had nearly accepted a $2.98 million offer from the Los Angeles Dodgers the previous September. Boras advised Hochevar to decline the offer.
 Following the 2006 season, Boras advised J. D. Drew to opt out of the final three years and $33 million remaining on his contract with the Los Angeles Dodgers. Boras then negotiated a five-year, $70 million contract for Drew with the Boston Red Sox. The contract was not finalized until January 26, 2007, because Boras and the Red Sox had to develop special contract language regarding potential injury to Drew's shoulder. Drew had the shoulder surgically repaired earlier in his career.
 On December 14, 2006, after weeks of speculation, public posturing, and intensely scrutinized negotiations, Boras finalized a six-year, $52 million contract for Japanese superstar pitcher Daisuke Matsuzaka to play for the Boston Red Sox. Matsuzaka was not a free agent (the Red Sox paid an additional $51.1 million to his Japanese team for exclusive negotiating rights), meaning Matsuzaka's only alternative to signing with the Red Sox was to return to Japan.
 Two weeks later, on December 28, 2006, Boras negotiated a record-breaking seven-year, $126 million contract with the San Francisco Giants for Barry Zito. The contract was the largest ever given to a pitcher in baseball history.

2007
 The 2007  collective bargaining agreement between Major League Baseball and the MLBPA imposed an August 15 deadline for draft picks to sign. This was in direct response to Boras's successful strategy of advising draft picks like Jason Varitek, J. D. Drew, Stephen Drew, Jered Weaver, Luke Hochevar and Max Scherzer to wait as long as possible to sign and marked at least the third time baseball rules were changed because of Boras.
 On August 13, 2007, Boras finalized a record-breaking $7.3 million contract with the Detroit Tigers for the 27th overall draft pick, Rick Porcello. The four-year major league contract, which could end up paying Porcello over $10 million, was the largest contract ever given to a high school player.
 On October 28, 2007, Boras and New York Yankees third baseman Alex Rodriguez exercised the right to opt out of Rodriguez's original 10-year, $252 million contract, with three years and $72 million remaining. Boras and Rodriguez were criticized for the timing of the decision, which leaked during Game 4 of the 2007 World Series. Rodriguez met with Yankees officials in Miami, and afterward Rodriguez instructed Boras to finalize a record-breaking 10-year, $275 million contract. Boras and the Yankees then crafted a series of unique marketing bonuses that will pay Rodriguez an additional $30 million for tying and surpassing Willie Mays, Babe Ruth, Hank Aaron, and Barry Bonds on the all-time home run list. The high-profile opt-out and negotiations strained Boras and Rodriguez's relationship, and Rodriguez hired Madonna's manager to be his marketing representative, but Boras retained his role as Rodriguez's baseball agent and has since reported that their relationship is "repaired".
 In December 2007, Boras negotiated a two-year, $36.2 million contract for Andruw Jones with the Los Angeles Dodgers, making Jones the fifth highest paid player in the major leagues despite a .222 batting average during the 2007 season. Following a poor 2008 season, Boras negotiated Jones's release from the Dodgers in January 2009 in return for deferring the remaining money owed on the contract. Jones then signed a minor-league contract with the Texas Rangers.

2008
 On July 31, 2008, Boras negotiated away the option years on Manny Ramirez's contract with the Boston Red Sox as part of Ramirez's trade to the Los Angeles Dodgers, making Ramirez a free agent after the 2008 season, two years early.
 On August 15, 2008, negotiations between Boras and the Pittsburgh Pirates regarding second overall draft pick Pedro Alvarez went up to (and beyond) the midnight deadline for draft picks to sign. Major League Baseball unilaterally extended the deadline, and Boras and the MLBPA filed a grievance. After weeks of legal wrangling, Alvarez signed a major league contract for $6.355 million.
 In December 2008, Boras negotiated an eight-year, $180 million contract for Mark Teixeira with the New York Yankees, making Teixeira the highest-paid first baseman in baseball history and the third highest-paid player in all of baseball, behind only Alex Rodriguez and Derek Jeter.

2009
 In January 2009, He negotiated a four-year, $60 million contract with the Atlanta Braves for Derek Lowe and a three-year, $36 million contract with the New York Mets for Óliver Pérez.
 In February 2009, Boras secured a two-year, $45 million deal for Manny Ramirez with the Los Angeles Dodgers.
 In August 2009, Boras negotiated the largest contract in draft history for first overall pick Stephen Strasburg, a $15.1 million major league contract with the Washington Nationals.
 Several other Boras clients also signed record-breaking deals following the 2009 draft, including Donavan Tate's $6.25 million signing bonus with the San Diego Padres (largest ever for a high school player), Jacob Turner's $4.7 million signing bonus with the Detroit Tigers (largest ever given to a high school pitcher, part of a major league contract that could pay Turner an additional $4 million) and second-overall pick Dustin Ackley's $6 million signing bonus (tied for the largest upfront bonus in history, part of a major league contract worth up to $10 million with $7.5 million guaranteed).

2010
 In January 2010, Boras negotiated a seven-year, $120 million contract with the St. Louis Cardinals for Matt Holliday, the largest contract in team history.
 In August 2010, Boras brokered a record five-year, $9.9 million deal for the #1 overall pick in the draft, 17-year-old Bryce Harper, with the Washington Nationals. It marked the second year in a row Boras and the Nationals collaborated on a record deal for the top overall pick in the draft. Harper's contract set a new standard for position players in the draft, breaking the previous record held by Boras's deal for Mark Teixeira in 2001. Like fellow Boras client Landon Powell in 2000, Harper earned his GED early in order to enter the draft sooner than would otherwise have been possible.
 Harper led a series of Boras clients who signed high-profile contracts at the top of the draft, including #3 overall pick Manny Machado, #4 overall pick Christian Colon, #7 overall pick Matt Harvey, #24 overall pick Gary Brown, and Anthony Ranaudo, the Red Sox' sandwich round pick who was considered the top college pitcher in the country heading into the 2010 season.
 In November 2010, the New York Times ran an article about loans Boras's firm made to a Dominican client, Edward Salcedo, over a period of several years. Boras dismissed the Salcedo loans as a "non-issue" that complied with the MLBPA's rules. Salcedo himself also disputed the Times' report.  Subsequent analysis by the baseball press supported Boras's position, leading at least one prominent commentator to question the agenda underlying the Times' reports.
 On December 5, 2010, Boras negotiated a seven-year, $126 million contract for Jayson Werth with the Washington Nationals, only three months after Werth hired him. The contract tied for the third largest in baseball history for an outfielder, trailing only Manny Ramirez's contract with the Boston Red Sox and Alfonso Soriano's contract with the Chicago Cubs.

2011
 On January 3, 2011, Boras finalized a seven-year, $80 million contract for Carlos González with the Colorado Rockies. Gonzalez won Gold Glove and Silver Slugger awards in 2010, his first full season in the major leagues.
 Two days later, on January 5, Boras finished negotiations on a six-year, $96 million contract for Adrián Beltré with the Texas Rangers, the second major free agent contract of Beltré's career. Beltré previously signed for five years and $64 million with the Mariners, starting with the 2005 season. After that contract finished with an injury year for Beltré, Boras negotiated a one-year, $10 million contract with the Boston Red Sox for 2010 that included a player option for 2011. Boras recommended that Beltré take a short-term deal, calling it a "pillow contract" that gave Beltré a soft landing while he restored his market value. Boras's inclusion of a player option allowed Beltré to play without fear of injury (what Boras called a "calamity scenario"), since at worst Beltré could exercise the option and guarantee himself $5 million for 2011. Beltré proved not to need the insurance, as he was an All-Star for Boston, finishing 9th in AL MVP voting. Following the season Beltré declined the option, which had doubled to $10 million once he hit 640 plate appearances. Beltré and Boras then leveraged Beltré's rebound season into an additional year and $32 million more from the Rangers than Beltré received from the Mariners in 2004, even though Beltré entered the Rangers contract six years older.
 On January 15, Boras completed a three-year, $35 million contract for Rafael Soriano to pitch for the New York Yankees. The deal is notable for Soriano's right to opt out of the contract following each season, effectively giving Soriano the power to leave the Yankees and seek a larger contract elsewhere without sacrificing the full guaranteed value should he suffer injury or poor performance. Soriano would use this to opt out following the 2012 season.
 On January 18, Boras negotiated a one-year arbitration settlement for Prince Fielder with the Milwaukee Brewers that will pay him $15.5 million in 2011, his last year of arbitration eligibility. The settlement was the largest single-season arbitration contract in Major League history, 24% larger than the previous record of $12.5 million, negotiated by Boras for Mark Teixeira in 2008. It also made Fielder the highest-paid player in Brewers history.
 Boras and his firm negotiated roughly $444.5 million in contracts during the 2010–2011 offseason, over $120 million more than any other firm.
 On March 7, 2011, former University of Kentucky baseball player James Paxton signed with the Seattle Mariners for $942,500. Paxton had previously sued Kentucky over the NCAA's demand (through the school) that he reveal the contents of his conversations with Boras, an attorney. The issue arose because Toronto Blue Jays President Paul Beeston suggested in a media interview that he had communicated with Boras regarding Paxton.  Paxton refused to submit to the interview sought by the NCAA, citing the due process protections in UK's student code of conduct. Under threat from the NCAA, the school refused to clear Paxton to play. Paxton had previously turned down approximately $874,000 from the Blue Jays before signing with the Mariners.
 On June 6, 2011, Gerrit Cole was selected by the Pittsburgh Pirates with the first overall pick in the draft, marking the third consecutive year a player advised by Boras was selected first overall. (Stephen Strasburg was selected #1 in 2009, followed by Bryce Harper in 2010.) On August 15, Boras negotiated an all-time record bonus of $8 million for Cole, surpassing the $7.5 million Boras negotiated for Strasburg in 2009.
 Also on August 15, 2011, Boras negotiated a record contract for Bubba Starling, a high school phenom with a football scholarship to the University of Nebraska, who was selected fifth overall by the Kansas City Royals. Starling received a $7.5 million signing bonus, the second largest in draft history (behind only the bonus Boras negotiated for Cole, and tied with the bonus Boras negotiated for Strasburg). Starling's bonus was also the largest ever for a high school player (surpassing the $6.5 million bonus Boras negotiated for Tate in 2009), and the largest ever for a high school player (surpassing Tate and Harper). His contract also represented the most guaranteed money ever given to a high school player (surpassing Porcello).
 Boras also negotiated a four-year major league contract worth a guaranteed $7.2 million for Anthony Rendon, 2010 winner of the Dick Howser Trophy ("the Heisman Trophy of college baseball") as the top player in the country, who was drafted sixth overall by the Washington Nationals.
 Boras client Josh Bell received a record-breaking signing bonus of $5 million from the Pirates, who had drafted him in the second round. The bonus was over $1.5 million more than any other player had received outside the first round. With the deals for Cole and Bell, Boras negotiated more from Pirates in 2011 than any other team had ever spent on its entire draft (50+ rounds).
 Finally, Boras negotiated $3 million bonuses for Brian Goodwin from the Washington Nationals and Austin Hedges from the San Diego Padres, each tied for the third-highest bonuses in draft history outside the first round, and negotiated a bigger bonus for Alex Meyer ($2 million from the Nationals) than four other college pitchers selected ahead of Meyer in the 2011 draft.

2012
 On January 24, 2012, Boras secured a nine-year, $214 million contract for Prince Fielder with the Detroit Tigers, the fourth-largest contract ever for a baseball player. The deal surprised many in the industry with its length, its size, and the identity of the signing team, as it appeared that Boras might be boxed in by a lukewarm market for Fielder. With the Fielder deal, Boras became responsible for three of the four $200 million-plus deals in the history of the game (the other two being Alex Rodriguez's deals with the Texas Rangers and New York Yankees).
 In June, Boras advised five first-round draft picks: Albert Almora, Mark Appel, Addison Russell, Corey Seager, and Deven Marrero.
 Boras negotiated a $3,900,000 bonus for Almora from the Chicago Cubs as the sixth overall pick. The deal was $650,000 above the recommended "slot value."
 Pundits ranked Appel as the top prospect available in the draft. However, the Houston Astros selected Carlos Correa first overall and signed him to a contract for $2.4 million below his "slot value."
 The Astros' savings from signing Correa and other players below their slot values ended up going to Boras advisees Lance McCullers Jr. and Rio Ruiz. McCullers was the Astros' supplemental first-round pick, and received a bonus of $2.5 million, or $1.24 million above "slot value." Ruiz was the Astros' 4th-round pick, and received a bonus of $1.85 million or $1.5 million above "slot value."
 The Pirates selected Appel eighth overall. Appel chose to return to school rather than sign for the 8th pick's "slot value" of $2.9 million. The Astros then selected Appel first overall in the 2013 draft, and he signed with Houston for $6.35 million.
 The Oakland A's selected Russell 11th and he signed for $2.625 million. The Los Angeles Dodgers selected Seager 18th and he signed for $2.35 million, $400,000 above "slot value." The Boston Red Sox selected Marrero 24th and he signed for $2.05 million, $300,000 above "slot value." Of the five first-round picks who received above their "slot value" in 2012, three of the five were Boras advisees.
 On December 10, Boras completed a six-year, $36 million contract for Hyun-Jin Ryu with the Los Angeles Dodgers. Ryu had been pitching for the Hanwha Eagles in Korea, and the Dodgers paid $25.7 million for the exclusive right to sign him. Ryu's contract also contains innings bonuses worth up to $1 million per year, and other salary escalators. Ryu also can opt out of the contract if the Dodgers trade him, or after the 2017 season if he has reached 750 innings pitched in his career.

2013
 In February, Boras negotiated a four-year, $48 million contract for Michael Bourn with the Cleveland Indians. In March, Boras secured a three-year, $33 million contract for Kyle Lohse from the Milwaukee Brewers. Both players were subject to draft pick compensation under new rules that Boras dismissed as "corrupt" because they do not "reward performance."
 In March, Boras secured an eight-year, $120 million extension for Elvis Andrus with the Texas Rangers. The contract covered the 2013–2022 seasons. Andrus would otherwise have been a free agent after the 2014 season. Both Rangers GM Jon Daniels and Boras called the contract "unusual." It contained a vesting option that could raise the value to $135 million over nine years. It also allowed Andrus to opt out following the 2018 and 2019 seasons, when he will be 29 or 30 years old. Andrus also received no-trade protection and award bonuses worth up to $800,000 per year.
 In June, Boras advised four first-round draft picks: Mark Appel, Kris Bryant, Sean Manaea, and Michael Lorenzen.
 Boras negotiated a $6.35 million bonus for Appel as the #1 pick, by the Astros. That more than doubled what Appel turned down from the Pirates the year before.
 Boras also negotiated the largest bonus of any player in the draft ($6,708.400) for Bryant, selected #2 by the Cubs.
 The Royals selected Manaea 34th overall, knowing he needed hip surgery before he could play again. Boras negotiated a bonus of $3.55 million, almost $2 million above "slot value."
 Boras negotiated a $1.5 million bonus for Lorenzen from the Reds as the #38 pick, roughly $30,000 above "slot value".
 In July, Boras negotiated a $1.625 million bonus from the Chicago Cubs for Jen-Ho Tseng, an 18-year-old pitcher from Taiwan who pitched in the 2013 World Baseball Classic.
 Also in July, rapper and novice sports agent Jay-Z mentioned Boras in a song on his new album, referencing the decision by Robinson Canó to go with Jay-Z rather than Boras and accusing Boras of being "over baby." Boras declined to respond, instead telling the media he preferred the music of longtime client Bernie Williams.
 On December 3, Boras negotiated a seven-year, $153 million contract for Red Sox center fielder Jacoby Ellsbury to join the rival New York Yankees. An option year could raise the total value to $169 million over eight years. The Red Sox had offered Ellsbury a below-market $100 million contract and were outbid by the Yankees in an echo of Damon's 2005 deal. Both were top-of-the-order outfielders represented by Boras, fresh off a championship with Boston. Mainstream media described the deal as a "monster" and "brain-melting."
 On December 21, Boras completed a seven-year contract for free agent Shin-Soo Choo with the Texas Rangers. The contract guaranteed Choo $130 million. Entering the offseason, MLB general managers suggested in the media that Choo's value was much lower. They cited Michael Bourn's four-year $48 million contract, or B.J. Upton's five-year, $75 million contract as the proper barometer for Choo. Instead, Choo became the first player without an All-Star appearance to sign a contract worth $100 million or more.

2014
 In 2014, two Boras free agent clients, Stephen Drew and Kendrys Morales, did not sign until late May and early June respectively. Both players were subject to draft pick compensation under MLB rules, dampening their market. Boras criticized the compensation rules, while the MLBPA launched an investigation into team conduct. The rules, which Boras dismissed as "corrupt" the previous winter, also hurt the market for players Boras did not represent, like Nelson Cruz, Ubaldo Jiménez, and Ervin Santana. All three signed one-year deals before the start of the 2014 regular season. That meant all three were again exposed to the draft pick compensation rules following the 2014 season. By waiting to sign, Drew and Morales avoided any draft pick compensation following the 2014 season.
 In June, teams selected five Boras clients in the first round of the draft: Carlos Rodon, Alex Jackson, Michael Conforto, Erick Fedde, and Matt Chapman.
 Boras negotiated the largest bonus of any player in the draft for Rodon, $6.582 million for the #3 selection from the Chicago White Sox. Rodon's bonus was also $860,500 above the "slot value" recommended by Major League Baseball. For comparison, the players selected #2 and #4 accepted bonuses $821,800 and $1,496,200 below "slot value."
 Boras also brokered deals for Jackson, Conforto, Fedde, and Chapman. Jackson received a $4,200,000 bonus to sign with the Mariners as the #6 selection, $624,100 above the "slot value." Conforto received $2,970,800 (exactly "slot value") from the Mets at #10. Fedde, who underwent Tommy John surgery just days before the draft, received $2,511,100 ($365,500 above slot value) from the Nationals at #18. Chapman received $1,750,000 from the Oakland A's at #25.

2015
 On January 19, 2015, Boras negotiated a 7-year, $210 million contract with the Washington Nationals for free agent Max Scherzer, who turned down at least $144 million from the Detroit Tigers before the 2014 season. Boras helped Scherzer secure insurance against an injury suffered before free agency.

2019

 On February 28, 2019, Boras negotiated what was at the time (until Mike Trout's contract extension broke the record 19 days later) an MLB record 13-year, $330 million contract with the Philadelphia Phillies for free agent Bryce Harper. This contract is not only significant for what was at the time record-breaking money, but the inclusion of a no-trade clause and no-opt-out clauses, meaning Harper will play for the Phillies until 2031.
On December 2, 2019, third baseman Mike Moustakas signed a 4-year, $64 million deal with the Cincinnati Reds.
On Monday, December 9, 2019, Boras negotiated what was at the time the largest contact for a pitcher in both total value and average annual value at $245 million over 7 years with the Washington Nationals for free agent Stephen Strasburg. The contract beat out David Price's $217 million contract in total value and Zack Greinke's $31.5 million per year contract in average annual value. The contract had a full no-trade clause and $80 million in deferred payments to be paid by 2029.
Just a day later on December 10, 2019, Boras once again set records when he landed free agent Gerrit Cole a contract with the New York Yankees worth $324 million over 9 years. This contract became the largest ever given to a pitcher in terms of total salary and average annual value, at $36 million, beating out Stephen Strasburg, as well as the fourth largest contract in MLB history. The contract includes a full no-trade clause as well as a player option after the 2025 season.
Just one day after that on December 11, Boras signed free agent third baseman Anthony Rendon to a 7-year, $245 million contract with the Los Angeles Angels. With the signing, Boras had signed his clients to $814 million in contracts in just three days.
On December 21, starting pitcher Dallas Keuchel was signed to the White Sox for 3-year and $55.5 million.
Left-handed Korean starting pitcher Hyun-jin Ryu signed a 4-year, $80 million contract with the Toronto Blue Jays on December 27, 2019. With the signing, Boras's clients have signed contracts totaling more than $1 billion ($1,013,500,000) in three weeks for the month of December.

2021 

 On February 7, 2021, Albert Almora Jr. signed a 1-year, $1.25 million contract with the New York Mets.
 On February 18, 2021, Trevor Rosenthal signed a 1-year, $11 million contract with the Oakland Athletics.
 On February 12, 2021, Jake Arrieta signed a 1-year, $6 million contract with the Chicago Cubs.
 On February 13, 2021, James Paxton signed a 1-year, $8.5 million contract with the Seattle Mariners.
 On March 8, 2021, Jackie Bradley Jr. signed a 2-year, $24 million contract with the Milwaukee Brewers.
 On March 24, 2021, Lance McCullers signed a 4-year, $84 million contract extension with the Houston Astros.

 On November 28, 2021, Marcus Semien agreed to a 7-year, $175 million contract with the Texas Rangers.
 On November 29, 2021, Max Scherzer agreed to a 3-year, $130 million contract with the New York Mets with an opt-out after 2023.
 On November 29, 2021, Corey Seager agreed to a 10-year, $325 million contract with the Texas Rangers.
 On November 30, 2021, James Paxton agreed to a 1-year, $10 million contract with the Boston Red Sox.

2022 
 On March 11, 2022, Carlos Rodón agreed to a 2-year, $44 million contract with the San Francisco Giants with an opt-out after 2022.
 On March 12, 2022, Yusei Kikuchi agreed to a 3-year, $36 million contract with the Toronto Blue Jays.
 On March 12, 2022, José Iglesias agreed to a 1-year, $5 million contract with the Colorado Rockies.
 On March 13, 2022, Ian Kennedy agreed to a 1-year, $4.75 million contract with the Arizona Diamondbacks.
 On March 16, 2022, Kris Bryant agreed to a 7-year, $182 million contract with the Colorado Rockies.
 On March 18, 2022, Carlos Correa agreed to a 3-year, $105.3 million contract with the Minnesota Twins with opt-outs after 2022 and 2023.

 On December 6, 2022, Josh Bell agreed to a 2-year, $33 million contract with the Cleveland Guardians with an opt-out after 2023.
 On December 6, 2022, Cody Bellinger agreed to a 1-year, $17.5 million contract with the Chicago Cubs.
 On December 6, 2022, Taijuan Walker agreed to a 4-year, $72 million contract with the Philadelphia Phillies.
 On December 7, 2022, Masataka Yoshida agreed to a 4-year, $90 million contract with the Boston Red Sox. Yoshida's posting fee from his NPB team, the Orix Buffaloes was $15.4 million.
 On December 7, 2022, Xander Bogaerts agreed to an 11-year, $280 million contract with the San Diego Padres.
 On December 8, 2022, Brandon Nimmo agreed to an 8-year, $162 million contract with the New York Mets.
 On December 11, 2022, Sean Manaea agreed to a 2-year, $25 million contract with the San Francisco Giants with an opt-out after 2023.
 On December 15, 2022, Carlos Rodón agreed to a 6-year, $162 million contract with the New York Yankees.
 On December 16, 2022, Joey Gallo agreed to a 1-year, $11 million contract with the Minnesota Twins.
 On December 17, 2022, Austin Hedges agreed to a 1-year, $5 million contract with the Pittsburgh Pirates.
 On December 23, 2022, Michael Conforto agreed to a 2-year, $36 million contract with the San Francisco Giants with an opt-out after 2023.

2023 
 On January 4, 2023, Rafael Devers agreed to an 11-year, $331 million contract extension with the Boston Red Sox.

 On January 10, 2023, Carlos Correa agreed to a 6-year, $200 million contract with the Minnesota Twins.

References

External links

Boras Corporation website
Scott Boras at Baseball Library

1952 births
Living people
American lawyers
American sports agents
Arkansas Travelers players
Baseball players from Sacramento, California
Baseball second basemen
Baseball third basemen
Companies based in Newport Beach, California
Gulf Coast Cardinals players
McGeorge School of Law alumni
Midland Cubs players
Pacific Tigers baseball players
Sportspeople from Elk Grove, California
Sportspeople from Newport Beach, California
St. Petersburg Cardinals players